The Eaten Alive Demos is an album of demos written and produced by Barry Gibb for Diana Ross' 1985 album Eaten Alive, made available as downloads on iTunes in October 2006. The album contained most of the songs with the exception of the title track and "Chain Reaction". In the spring of 2009, when iTunes changed into DRM-free downloads with higher bit-rates; all of the Barry Gibb demos were no longer available. In August 2011 all of the Barry Gibb demos reappeared on iTunes shortly after the opening of the download store on his official website where many of the same tracks were available. Another demo of the title track by Michael Jackson is known to have been recorded, but, to this date, has not yet surfaced.

In 1985, Gibb teamed with Albhy Galuten and Karl Richardson for the last time to produce an album for a major artist, Diana Ross. Gibb first recorded the first four songs, "Oh Teacher", "I'm Watching You" and "Don't Give Up on Each Other". Michael Jackson recorded the title track around May 1985 but it remains unreleased.

Track listing

Personnel
Barry Gibb – vocals, guitar
Albhy Galuten – piano, synthesizer
Unknown – bass guitar, drums

References

Barry Gibb albums
2006 albums
Demo albums